Heath End is a village in the Waverley district of Surrey, England, traditionally part of the large town parish of Farnham.  Heath End is smaller in area than most villages and does not have an Anglican church so does not meet the older criteria for villages in England. It is between Farnham and Aldershot. To the north homes directly adjoin an upland in Hampshire which is a military training area.

History and geography
The north part in terms of parish, of Hale, Heath End grew rapidly after 1854, when the British Army became established in Aldershot. As the building of cottages spread, those in this area acquired its distinct name-being the homes at the end of the large military heath (in this case sandy, acidic high land that is part of the Bagshot Formation) to the west.

Heath End housed a campus of Aldershot Army College, now demolished.  No dual carriageways or railways bisect the area, the nearest part of the heath is a long promontory (Hungry Hill) of 160m Above Ordnance Datum — Heath End itself at 120-140m Above Ordnance Datum.

The current Heath End School building was completed in 1968. Rising to four storeys, it stands above most of the surrounding estates of various uses, but primarily residential use.

The actor Bill Maynard was born in the village in 1928.

Demography
The United Kingdom Census 2011 considered the village as five relevant output layers, approximately a third of the ward.

The proportion of households all divisions of Heath End who owned their home outright was close to the borough average and above the national average in four divisions.  The proportion who owned their home with a loan was in each case greater than the national average.   In the east was a proportion in 2011 close to the national average of private and socially rented residential property: 24.8%.

Local government
As to wards of the United Kingdom the area is a northern portion of Farnham Hale and Heath End that elects two borough

councillors and had a population of 4,270 in 2011.

References

Villages in Surrey
Borough of Waverley